Bukovski Vrh (formerly Vrh Bukovo, locally Vrh) is a small settlement above Bukovo in the Littoral region of Slovenia. It lies on a plateau high above the Bača Valley in the Municipality of Tolmin.

Geography
Bukovski Vrh is a scattered settlement northeast, east, and southeast of Črv Peak, the highest point on the Šentviška Gora Plateau. It includes the hamlets and isolated farms of Doline, Lipeta (a.k.a. Pri Bajtah), Pirc, Pušnik, Seljak, Svinače, and Velikonja. The surrounding area falls steeply to the north toward the Bača Gorge, and to the northeast transitions to the Bukovo Pass. It is a largely wooded area transitioning to a karst landscape. There are tilled fields in cleared areas. There are a few small springs in the area; Zakukar Spring has been walled in to provide water for the former dairy and school in the hamlet of Svinače.

History

The village formerly had a much larger population, numbering 120 people in 20 houses in 1910. The population fell due to out-migration, especially after 1954, due to the village's difficult access. After the snow emergency of February 1952, many chamois relocated to the area from the Lower Bohinj Mountains. A dairy facility formerly operated in Bukovski Vrh, but it was abandoned in 1960. The school in the village closed in 1974.

References

External links 

Bukovski Vrh on Geopedia

Populated places in the Municipality of Tolmin